Numerous composers of Western classical music were LGBT, from at least the 16th century to the modern day. Many of these composers faced persecution or violence as a result of their sexuality.

16th century

17th century

18th century

19th century

20th century

21st century

References

Citations

Sources
 
 
 
 
 
 

LGBT culture
LGBT history
 
LGBT
Composers